WUVI may refer to:

 WUVI (AM), a defunct radio station (1090 AM) formerly licensed to serve Charlotte Amalie, U.S. Virgin Islands
 WUVI-LP, a low-power radio station (97.3 FM) licensed to serve John Brewers Bay, U.S. Virgin Islands
 WUVI-LD, a low-power television station (channel 20) licensed to serve West Lafayette, Indiana, United States